Homesick for You is a 1952 West German musical film directed by Robert A. Stemmle and starring Margot Hielscher, Peter Pasetti and Josefin Kipper. It was shot at the Tempelhof Studios in West Berlin. The film's sets were designed by the art directors Franz Schroedter and Karl Weber.

Cast
 Margot Hielscher as Marion Peters
 Peter Pasetti as Kurt Hellwig
 Josefin Kipper as Gretl Fiala
 Peter Mosbacher as Walter Schumann
 Wilfried Seyferth as Vicky Hanke
 Walter Gross as Paulchen Friese
 Wolfgang Lukschy as Georg Weiler
 Bully Buhlan as Singer
 Rita Paul as Kläre Winter
 Käthe Haack as Frau Peters
 Emmy Burg as Witwe Zillmann
 Martin Held as Direktor Petermann
 Paul Esser as Otto Klemke
 Renate Feuereisen as Eva Wandel
 Liselotte Malkowsky as Singer
 Helmut Zacharias as Violin
 Gerhard Wendland as Singer
 Michael Schuricke as Singer
 Rudi Schuricke as Singer
 Friedel Hensch as Singer
 Heino Gaze
 Kurt Weber as Singer
 Anni Dobra as Freundin von Petermann
 Kurt Engel
 Das Cornell-Trio as Singers
 Paul Heidemann
 Rias Tanzorchester as Orchestra
 The Schöneberger Sängerknaben
 Ruth Stephan
 Ivo Veit

References

Bibliography 
 Parish, James Robert. Film Actors Guide. Scarecrow Press, 1977.

External links 
 

1952 films
1952 musical films
German musical films
West German films
1950s German-language films
Films directed by Robert A. Stemmle
Films set in 1939
Films set in 1952
Films about musical groups
German black-and-white films
1950s German films
Films shot at Tempelhof Studios